Western Province cricket team was a team that represented the Western Province of Sri Lanka in domestic first-class cricket in the Inter-Provincial Cricket Tournament. Western Province played three first-class matches in 1990, four in 2003–04, and three in 2004–05.

External links
 First-class matches played by Western Province at CricketArchive

Former senior cricket clubs of Sri Lanka